Cornelius Johnson may refer to:

Cornelius Johnson (athlete), American high jumper
Cornelius Johnson (offensive lineman), NFL player
Cornelius Johnson (artist), English painter, also known as Cornelis van Ceulen Janssens
Cornelius Johnson (wide receiver), American football wide receiver
Cornelius Johnson, drummer for the funk band Ohio Players